Roxor can mean any of the following:

Roxor Games
Mahindra Roxor - 4x4 offroad vehicle